Milcoiu is a commune located in Vâlcea County, Muntenia, Romania. It is composed of six villages: Căzănești, Ciutești, Izbășești, Milcoiu, Șuricaru and Tepșenari.

References

Communes in Vâlcea County
Localities in Muntenia